Farewell to Kennedy is an episode of General Electric Theater. It starred Alan Ladd who made it hoping that the show would lead to a regular TV series. This did not happen.

The episode was directed by Frank Tuttle and starred Ladd.

References

External links
 

1955 in American television